The women's 3000 metres relay at the 2017 Asian Winter Games was held from February 21 to February 22, 2017 in Sapporo, Japan.

Schedule
All times are Japan Standard Time (UTC+09:00)

Results
Legend
q — Qualified by time

Heats

Heat 1

Heat 2

Final

References

Results summary

External links
Official website

Women Relay